Protem is a hamlet some 30 km north of Bredasdorp and 40 km south-west of Swellendam. The name is an abbreviation of Latin pro tempore, 'for the time being'. The centre was to have served as a temporary railway terminal on the line from Caledon to Swellendam, but the rest of the line was never constructed.

References

Populated places in the Cape Agulhas Local Municipality